was a general in the Imperial Japanese Army, Governor-General of Korea, and Prime Minister of Japan.

Early life and military career
Abe was born on November 24, 1875, in Kanazawa, Ishikawa Prefecture, the son of the former samurai Abe Nobumitsu, who had served the Kaga Domain. His brother-in-law was Imperial Japanese Navy admiral Shigeyoshi Inoue.

Abe attended Tokyo No.1 Middle School (Tokyo Metropolitan Hibiya High School) followed by No.4 High School. While he was still a student, he volunteered for military service during the First Sino-Japanese War.

After the war, Abe graduated from the Imperial Japanese Army Academy in November 1897. Commissioned a second lieutenant the following 27 June, he was promoted to lieutenant in November 1900 and attended the Army Artillery School, graduating in December 1901. Promoted to captain in November 1903, he enrolled in the 19th class of the Army War College, graduating in November 1907.  The ultranationalist General Araki Sadao was one of his classmates.

Abe was promoted to major in December 1908, becoming an instructor at the Army War College in September 1909. In November 1910, he was posted to the German Empire as a military attaché at the Japanese embassy and became a supplementary attaché at the embassy in Vienna in February 1913.

Abe was promoted to lieutenant colonel in February 1915 and to colonel on 24 July 1918. He served as the commander of the 3rd Field Artillery Regiment from 1918 to 1921. In August 1918, his regiment was sent to Siberia during Japan's Siberian Intervention but never saw combat. He became secretary of the Army War College on 3 June 1921, and was promoted to major general on 15 August 1922. Appointed Director of the General Affairs Division of the Imperial General Staff on 6 August 1923, following the devastating earthquake of 1 September, he was placed in charge of overseeing martial law for the Kanto region on 3 September.

He was appointed director of military service affairs in the Army Ministry on 28 July 1926 and was promoted to lieutenant general on 5 March 1927. He later served as chief of the Military Affairs Bureau and as Vice Minister of the Army, which he had been appointed as on 10 August 1928. He commanded the 4th Infantry Division from 22 December 1930.

In January 1932, Abe was appointed to command the Japanese Taiwan Army and was promoted to full general on 19 June 1933. After serving on the Supreme War Council, he was placed on the reserve list on 10 March 1936.

Prime Minister

Abe was not the obvious first choice as Prime Minister after the collapse of the Hiranuma Kiichirō cabinet. From the civilian side, Konoe Fumimaro or Hirota Kōki were regarded as front-runners, but the Army and the ultranationalists strongly supported General Ugaki Kazushige. After genrō Saionji Kinmochi declared his lack of enthusiasm for any of those candidates, the Army was poised to have its way. However, Ugaki fell ill and was hospitalized. The interim War Minister General Abe was a compromise choice. He had the advantage of belonging to neither the Tōseiha nor the  Kodoha political factions within the Army and was also supported as a relative political moderate by the Imperial Japanese Navy. On the other hand, he was despised by many senior Army officers for his total lack of any combat experience.

Abe became Prime Minister on 30 August 1939. He concurrently held the portfolio of Foreign Minister. During a reign which lasted only four months, Abe sought to end as quickly as possible the Second Sino-Japanese War, and to maintain Japan's neutrality in the growing European conflict. He was also opposed to efforts by elements within the Army to form a political-military alliance with Nazi Germany and Fascist Italy. Increasingly lacking in support from either the military or the political parties, Abe was replaced by Mitsumasa Yonai in January 1940.

Later career
 Three months later after his replacement as Prime Minister, Abe was sent by the army as a special envoy to China to advise the Japanese-supported regime of Wang Jingwei in Nanjing and to negotiate a treaty ensuring Japanese economic and military rights in northern China. However, he had some sympathy for Wang's Reorganized National Government. Abe remained as the Japanese ambassador to China in Nanjing until December 1940. After his return to Japan, Abe joined the House of Peers in 1942, and accepted the largely-ceremonial position as president of the Imperial Rule Assistance Political Association. He was appointed the 10th (and last) Governor-General of Korea in 1944 and 1945.

After World War II, Abe was purged from public office and arrested by the American occupation government. However, he was not charged with any war crimes and was soon released.

His second son was Nobuhiro Abe.

Honours
Grand Cordon of the Order of the Sacred Treasure (November 1930)
Grand Cordon of the Order of the Rising Sun (April 1934)

References

Books

External links

Notes 

|-

|-

1875 births
1953 deaths
20th-century prime ministers of Japan
People from Kanazawa, Ishikawa
Prime Ministers of Japan
World War II political leaders
Governors-General of Korea
Japanese generals
Members of the House of Peers (Japan)
Imperial Rule Assistance Association politicians
20th-century Japanese politicians
Foreign ministers of Japan
Ambassadors of Japan to China
Heads of government who were later imprisoned